Acharya Devvrat  (born 18 January 1959) is an Indian politician and former educationalist who is serving as the 20th Governor of Gujarat. He is an Arya Samaj pracharak and served previously as the principal of a Gurukul in Kurukshetra, Haryana. Being the Governor of Gujarat, he is also the Chancellor of state universities of Gujarat.

In August 2015, Devvrat was appointed as the Governor of Himachal Pradesh. He continued till 21 July 2019, when he was replaced by Kalraj Mishra.

In June 2019, he was named as Governor of Gujarat replacing Om Prakash Kohli.

Devvrat is married to Darsana Devi.

See also

 Arya Samajis
 Hindu reformists

References

External links
 

|-

|-

1959 births
Living people
People from Panipat district
Arya Samajis
Governors of Himachal Pradesh
Governors of Gujarat
Heads of schools in India